The 2007 Three Days of De Panne was the 31st edition of the Three Days of De Panne cycle race and was held on 3 April to 5 April 2007. The race started in Middelkerke and finished in De Panne. The race was won by Alessandro Ballan.

General classification

References

Three Days of Bruges–De Panne
2007 in Belgian sport